

Ludwig Heilmann (9 August 1903 – 26 October 1959) was a German paratroop general in the Wehrmacht during World War II. He was a recipient of the Knight's Cross of the Iron Cross with Oak Leaves and Swords.

Awards
 Wehrmacht Long Service Award 4th and 3rd Class (2 October 1936)
 Iron Cross (1939) 2nd Class (2 October 1939) & 1st Class (14 June 1941)
 German Cross in Gold on 26 February 1942 as Major in the III./Fallschirmjäger-Regiment 3
 Knight's Cross of the Iron Cross with Oak Leaves and Swords
 Knight's Cross on 14 June 1941 as Major and commander of the III./Fallschirmjäger-Regiment 3
 412th Oak Leaves on 2 March 1944 as Oberst and commander of Fallschirmjäger-Regiment 3
 67th Swords on 15 May 1944 as Oberst and commander of Fallschirmjäger-Regiment 3

References
Citations

Bibliography

 
 
 
 

|-

1903 births
1959 deaths
Fallschirmjäger of World War II
Military personnel from Würzburg
People from the Kingdom of Bavaria
Recipients of the Gold German Cross
Recipients of the Knight's Cross of the Iron Cross with Oak Leaves and Swords
German prisoners of war in World War II held by the United States
German prisoners of war in World War II held by the United Kingdom
Major generals of the Luftwaffe